"Treat Me Right" is a song by American singer Pat Benatar, released on December 29, 1980, as the third and final single from her second studio album, Crimes of Passion (1980). Produced by Keith Olsen, the song was written by Doug Lubahn and Benatar.

Record World described it as a "driving rocker" that has "furious guitar lines."

Chart performance
"Treat Me Right" peaked at number 18 on the U.S. Billboard Hot 100 and spent two weeks at number 10 on the Cash Box Top 100.  The song also charted at number 31 on the U.S. Mainstream Rock chart and reached number 12 in Canada, where it was the 76th biggest hit of 1981.

Weekly charts

Year-end charts

Cover versions
 The song's co-writer, Doug Lubahn, also recorded the song with his own band, Riff Raff; it appeared on their 1981 album, Vinyl Futures.

Popular culture
The song was included in the 1982 film and soundtrack for the Richard Gere film, An Officer and a Gentleman.

References

External links
 

1980 singles
1980 songs
Chrysalis Records singles
Pat Benatar songs
Song recordings produced by Keith Olsen
Songs written by Pat Benatar